The Europe/Africa Zone is one of the three zones of regional Davis Cup competition in 2011.

In the Europe/Africa Zone there are three different groups in which teams compete against each other to advance to the next group.

The Division III tournament was held in the Week commencing 9 May 2011 at Skopje, Macedonia.

Turkey and Moldova were promoted.

Participating teams

Format
The twelve teams were split into four pools. The winner of a pool played against another group winner to decide which team gets promoted to the Europe/Africa Zone Group II for 2012.

It was held at 11–14 May 2011 at Tennis Club Jug-Skopje, Skopje, Macedonia on outdoor clay.

Group stage

Group A

Macedonia vs. San Marino

Andorra vs. San Marino

Macedonia vs. Andorra

Group B

Turkey vs. Albania

Norway vs. Albania

Turkey vs. Norway

Group C

Montenegro vs. Georgia

Armenia vs. Georgia

Montenegro vs. Armenia

Group D

Moldova vs. Malta

Iceland vs. Malta

Moldova vs. Iceland

Playoffs

9th to 12th Playoffs

Malta vs. Georgia

Albania vs. San Marino

5th to 8th Playoffs

Norway vs. Andorra

Iceland vs. Armenia

Promotion Playoffs

Macedonia vs. Turkey

Moldova vs. Montenegro

References

External links
Davis Cup draw details

Europe Zone Group III
Davis Cup Europe/Africa Zone